Brynjólfur  is an Icelandic masculine given name. People with that name include:

 Brynjólfur Bjarnason (1898-1989), Icelandic communist politician
 Brynjólfur Pétursson (1810-1851), Icelandic lawyer and government official
 Brynjólfur Sveinsson (1605-1675), Lutheran Bishop of the see of Skálholt in Iceland

See also
 

Icelandic masculine given names